Shaira Mae Dela Cruz (born May 3, 1995) is a Filipino actress. She is under GMA Network after signing an exclusive contract.

Filmography

TV series

Reality shows

Guest appearances

Film

Discography

References

 Anarcon, James Patrick (January 24, 2017) https://www.pep.ph/guide/tv/25431/tv5-actress-shaira-mae-joins-emtrops-emwill-she-be-transferring-to-gma-7?ref=site_search

External links 

Living people
Filipino film actresses
1995 births
Tagalog people
GMA Network personalities
TV5 (Philippine TV network) personalities
Filipino television actresses